Streptomyces paucisporeus is a bacterium species from the genus of Streptomyces which has been isolated from acidic soil from the Yunnan Province in China.

See also 
 List of Streptomyces species

References

Further reading

External links
Type strain of Streptomyces paucisporeus at BacDive -  the Bacterial Diversity Metadatabase	

paucisporeus
Bacteria described in 2006